Giulio Petroni (21 September 1917 – 31 January 2010) was an Italian director, writer, and screenwriter, best known for his spaghetti westerns Death Rides a Horse (1967), with Lee Van Cleef in one of his first starring roles, A Sky Full of Stars for a Roof (1968), and Tepepa (1969), with Orson Welles and Tomas Milian.

Occasionally Petroni has been listed under the pseudonym Jeremy Scott.

Life

Giulio Petroni was born in Rome on 21 September 1917. After graduating in literature, Giulio Petroni began working as a director making a short film for the INCOM newsreel, entitled Goethe in Rome. He also worked as a columnist for various newspapers.

After the Second World War - Petroni had participated as a partisan supporter of the communists and anti-fascists - he went to Ceylon, where he headed the local film department and made documentaries; on his return he continued this with a series of political documentaries. Political topics can also be discovered in his feature films - the revolutionary western Tepepa in particular offers a wealth of material for political analysis.

He debuted as a director in 1959 with the comedy film La cento chilometri, followed by two other feature films on the same year.
Then he worked for the RAI broadcasting company until he found his way back to the big screen in 1966 and was particularly successful in the spaghetti western genre.

From 1967 Petroni directed five spaghetti westerns, generally considered among the most important in its genre. In addition to those mentioned, titles include La notte dei serpenti (1969) and Life Is Tough, Eh Providence? (1972), with Tomas Milian as Provvidenza.

After withdrawing from the film business at the end of the 1970s, Petroni turned to writing as a novelist and essayist. In 1986, he won the Dessì Prize for fiction.

Literary works 
La città calda, G. Feltrinelli, Milano 1961
Il rivale, Marsilio, Venezia 1980
Le speranze e gli inganni, Dalia, Roma 1986
Il rancore, Dalia, Roma 1989
La strega di Colobraro, Dalia, Roma 1992
Se questa è una patria, Dalia, Roma 1995
Le ceneri del cinema italiano, Dalia, Roma 2001
La quadrupla verità, Roma, Dalia, stampa 2001
Lore Blum, Dalia, Roma 2002
Sgarbo a Sgarbi e la sua band, S.l. Dalia, 2002
Le passeggiate nelle sabbie mobili, Dalia, Roma 2004
Trash, Dalia, Roma 2004

Filmography

Director and Screenwriter 
 La cento chilometri (1959)
 A Sky Full of Stars for a Roof (aka Ciel de plomb or E per tetto un cielo di stelle)(1968)
 Tepepa (Trois pour un massacre) (1969)
 La notte dei serpenti (1969)
 Non commettere atti impuri (1971)
 Life Is Tough, Eh Providence? (On m'appelle Providence and/or La vita, a volto, è molto dura vero provvidenza?)(1972)
 Labbra di lurido blu (1975)
 L'osceno desiderio (1977) (under "Jeremy Scott")
 Il rivale (1987)

Director 
 I piaceri dello scapolo (1960)
 I soliti rapinatori a Milano (1963)
 Una domenica d'estate (1966)
 Death Rides a Horse (also known as La mort était au rendez-vous, D'homme à homme and/or Da uomo a uomo in Italian)(1967)
 A Sky Full of Stars for a Roof (...e per tetto un cielo di stelle) (1968)(under "Giulio Petrony")
 Crescete e moltiplicatevi (1973)

References

External links 
 
 Biography (In Italian)

1917 births
Writers from Rome
2010 deaths
Italian film directors
Italian male writers
Spaghetti Western directors